2-Aminopyridine is an organic compound with the formula H2NC5H4N. It is one of three isomeric aminopyridines. It is a colourless solid that is used in the production of the drugs piroxicam, sulfapyridine, tenoxicam, and tripelennamine.  It is produced by the reaction of sodium amide with pyridine, the Chichibabin reaction.

Structure
Although 2-hydroxypyridine converts significantly to the pyridone tautomer, the related imine tautomer (HNC5H4NH) is less important for 2-aminopyridine.

Toxicity
The acute toxicity is indicated by the LD50 = 200 mg/kg (rat, oral).

References

External links
 MSDS
 CDC - NIOSH Pocket Guide to Chemical Hazards - 2-Aminopyridine

Aminopyridines
2-Pyridyl compounds